The Haitian border threadsnake (Mitophis leptepileptus) is a possibly extinct species of snake in the family Leptotyphlopidae endemic to Haiti.

Description
Last seen in 1984, the species was thought to be already rare, but intensive surveys in the area have not recorded it. If it is extinct, causes are certainly due to deforestation of its habitat and agricultural activities, which have intensified since its last collection.

References

Mitophis
Reptiles of Haiti
Endemic fauna of Haiti
Reptiles described in 1985
Species known from a single specimen